The black-mantled goshawk (Accipiter melanochlamys) is a species of bird of prey in the family Accipitridae.
It is found in the highlands of New Guinea.
Its natural habitat is subtropical or tropical moist lowland forests.

References

black-mantled goshawk
Birds of prey of New Guinea
black-mantled goshawk
Taxonomy articles created by Polbot